In mathematics, the symmetric decreasing rearrangement of a function is a function which is symmetric and decreasing, and whose level sets are of the same size as those of the original function.

Definition for sets

Given a measurable set,  in  one defines the symmetric rearrangement of  called  as the ball centered at the origin, whose volume (Lebesgue measure) is the same as that of the set  

An equivalent definition is

where  is the volume of the unit ball and where  is the volume of

Definition for functions

The rearrangement of a non-negative, measurable real-valued function  whose level sets  (for ) have finite measure is

where  denotes the indicator function of the set   
In words, the value of  gives the height  for which the radius of the symmetric
Because the identity

holds for any non-negative function  the above definition is the unique definition that forces the identity  to hold.

Properties

The function  is a symmetric and decreasing function whose level sets have the same measure as the level sets of  that is,

If  is a function in  then

The Hardy–Littlewood inequality holds, that is,

Further, the Pólya–Szegő inequality holds.  This says that if  and if  then

The symmetric decreasing rearrangement is order preserving and decreases  distance, that is,

and

Applications

The Pólya–Szegő inequality yields, in the limit case, with  the isoperimetric inequality.  Also, one can use some relations with harmonic functions to prove the Rayleigh–Faber–Krahn inequality.

Nonsymmetric decreasing rearrangement

We can also define  as a function on the nonnegative real numbers rather than on all of   Let  be a σ-finite measure space, and let  be a measurable function that takes only finite (that is, real) values μ-a.e. (where "-a.e." means except possibly on a set of -measure zero).  We define the distribution function  by the rule

Note that this version of the decreasing rearrangement is not symmetric, as it is only defined on the nonnegative real numbers. However, it inherits many of the same properties listed above as the symmetric version, namely:

 The Hardy-Littlewood inequality holds, that is, 
  -a.e. implies 
  for all real numbers 
  for all 
  -a.e. implies 
  for all positive real numbers 
  for all positive real numbers 
 

The (nonsymmetric) decreasing rearrangement function arises often in the theory of rearrangement-invariant Banach function spaces. Especially important is the following:
Luxemburg Representation Theorem.  Let  be a rearrangement-invariant Banach function norm over a resonant measure space  Then there exists a (possibly not unique) rearrangement-invariant function norm  on  such that  for all nonnegative measurable functions  which are finite-valued -a.e.
Note that the definitions of all the terminology in the above theorem (that is, Banach function norms, rearrangement-invariant Banach function spaces, and resonant measure spaces) can be found in sections 1 and 2 of Bennett and Sharpley's book (cf. the references below).

See also

References

Measure theory
Multivariable calculus
Real analysis